Malout Institute of Management and Information Technology  (MIMIT) in Malout, Punjab, India, is under the guidance of a Board of Governors, headed by the Technical Education Minister, government of Punjab. MIMIT is the only government institute to offer both MBA and B.Tech. programs in Punjab. It offers four undergraduate courses — B.Tech.-IT, CSE, ECE and ME — and one postgraduate course: MBA. Also it offer BBA, B.Com and BCA. MIMIT is ranked first amongst PTU affiliated colleges.

It has hostels with a capacity of 350 boys and 150 girls.

Courses

Undergraduate courses
 Computer Science and Engineering
 Information Technology
 Electronics and Communication Engineering
 Mechanical Engineering 
 Bachelor Of Computer Application
 Bachelor Of Business Administration
 Bachelor Of Commerce -Honours

Postgraduate courses
 Master of Business Administration (specialization in Marketing, Finance and HRM)
 M.Tech. Industrial Engineering (part-time)

Facilities
Central Library: MIMIT has a  double-storied automated library. It has a digital library which includes e-journals, e-books, e-reference sources, databases of theses and dissertations, subject gateway and MIMIT digital resources. Users can access MIMIT Central Library at LAN level and at WAN level.
Central Computer Centre: There are four centrally air conditioned computer labs, which house up to 400 computers nodes each along with peripherals and internet connectivity

Main labs

 RDBMS Lab
 Microprocessor Lab
 Research Lab
 Electronics Lab
 Internet Lab
 Physics Lab
 Multimedia Lab
 Electrical Lab
 Data Communication Lab
 Digital Electronics Lab
 Chemistry Lab
 EGD Hall
 Control and Instrumentation Lab
 Fluid Mechanics Lab, (Mechanical Engineering)
 Strength of Materials Lab (Mechanical Engineering)
 Fluid Machines Lab.(Mechanical Engineering)
 Refrigeration and Air conditioning Lab (Mechanical Engineering)
 Computer aided Design and Manufacturing (CAD/CAM ).(Mechanical Engineering)
 Industrial Automation and Robotics Lab(Mechanical Engineering)
 Heat and Mass Transfer Lab.(Mechanical Engineering)
 Applied thermodynamics & IC Engines Lab.(Mechanical Engineering)
 Automobile Engineering Lab.(Mechanical Engineering)
 Engineering Materials & Metallurgy Lab. (Mechanical Engineering)
 Theory of Machines Lab. (Mechanical Engineering)
 Mechanical vibrations (Mechanical Engineering)
 Mechanical Measurement and Metrology (Mechanical Engineering) 
 Project Lab

Other
Faculty residences: Housing for the Director, officers, professors, assistant professors, lecturers, ministerial staff, and supporting staff on the campus.
Facilities: Market, departmental store, gymnasium and a guesthouse (fully air-conditioned; accommodates guests at nominal prices).
Transport: One 32-seat bus and one 52-seat bus, two jeeps, and an ambulance available 24 hours.
Water and electricity supply:'' 250 kW power generators ensure power supply during working hours. The labs and systems are protected by fire-fighting systems.

 Co-curricular activities Sports: The college basketball team won the PTU Zonal basketball tournament in 2006. The college handball team was runner-up in PTU Zonal handball tournament in session 2007, and won third position in PTU Zonal handball tournament in session 2008. Facilities exist for all the popular indoor and outdoor games:
Badminton courts
Basketball courts
Volleyball courts
Handball ground
Football ground
Hockey ground
Table tennis room
Athletic track
Concrete lawn tennis court
GymnasiumNSS: The National Service Scheme was formed in 1969 with an aim to provide service to society. NSS volunteers work to ensure that everyone in their society who is needy gets help so that they can enhance their standards and lead a life of dignity.NCC:''' MIMIT raised its NCC Unit (Girls) in August 2013.
Also raised its NCC Naval unit (boys and girls) In September 2018

Collaborations 
The institute has signed a Memorandum of Understanding with CISCO Inc. USA, which provides four semester programmes by online testing, student-performance tracking, and quality assurance plan in networking, with CISCO routers and switches. MIMIT affiliates with Sun Microsystems' Sun Academic Initiative (SAI). The programme is designed to introduce students to Sun technologies and equip them with skills in their chosen fields. It has been ranked top most college in India for past 30 years.

MIMIT is an institute member (IM1049) of the Indian Society of Technical Education, New Delhi. Most of the students of the college are members of the student chapter. The objective of ISTE is the education of students and faculty members through technical programmes, seminars, debates, etc.

References

Engineering colleges in Punjab, India
Educational institutions established in 1998
1998 establishments in Punjab, India